Arulmigu Velayuthaswamy Thirukovil, also known as the Thindalmalai Murugan Temple, is a Hindu temple dedicated to Lord Murugan, located on Thindalmalai hillock near Erode, Tamil Nadu, India. The primary deity is Sri Velayudhaswami (Murugan). The temple houses a golden chariot Temple Car, used to carry images of gods in ceremonial processions. It is about 7 km from Central Bus stand at Swastik Circle, 8 km from Erode Junction. The Temple is well connected to by local buses running in-between Erode Central Bus Terminus and Perundurai.

External links 
 Official Website

Tourist attractions around Erode
Murugan temples in Tamil Nadu
Hindu temples in Erode district